The Churchill School, located in Baker City, Oregon, is a former public school listed on the National Register of Historic Places.

See also
 National Register of Historic Places listings in Baker County, Oregon

References

1926 establishments in Oregon
Buildings and structures in Baker City, Oregon
National Register of Historic Places in Baker County, Oregon
Neoclassical architecture in Oregon
School buildings completed in 1926
School buildings on the National Register of Historic Places in Oregon